A counting agent is a type Electoral observer and may be self-nominated,  appointed by either the candidate standing for election or the candidate's election agent to oversee the counting at the election count. In the United Kingdom there is no legal requirement to appoint a counting agent. At elections in the Republic of Ireland, counting agents are called tallymen; they keep track not only of first-preference votes but also of transfers.

The number of counting agents which can be appointed is determined by the returning officer of the election and is usually dependent on the number of counting clerks at the count. Counting agents are appointed after the period when nominations to the election are made. The election timetable will state when counting agents have to be appointed, typically a week before polling day.

The role of the counting agent is to oversee the count itself, though they may not touch any of the ballot papers and must act through the returning officer.

During counts, generally only the candidate, the candidate's partner and the candidate's counting agents may enter the place where counting takes place.

The counting agent must follow a code of practice.

See also
Teller (elections)
Polling agent
Representation of the People Act

References

External links
The Local Elections (Principal Areas) (England and Wales) Rules 2006 (SI 2006/3304)

Political occupations
Elections in the United Kingdom
Constitution of the United Kingdom